Ana Paula Barros is an African-born American civil and environmental engineer currently the Donald Biggar Willett Chair of Engineering and Department Head of Civil and Environmental Engineering at the University of Illinois at Urbana-Champaign and an Elected Fellow of the American Association for the Advancement of Science and an Elected Fellow of the American Meteorological Society. In 2019 she was elected to the National Academy of Engineering for "contributions to understanding and prediction of precipitation dynamics and flood hazards in mountainous terrains". Prior to joining the University of Illinois, Professor Barros was the James L. Meriam Professor of Civil and Environmental Engineering at Duke University.

Education
She earned her diploma in civil engineering at University of Porto in 1985 and an M.Sc in ocean engineering in 1988 followed by her M.Sc in Environmental Engineering at OGI School of Science and Engineering in 1990 and then Ph.D. in Civil and Environmental Engineering at University of Washington in 1993.

Research
Her interests are hydrology and precipitation such as rainfall's effect on mountains and ground. Her highest cited paper is "Decoupling of erosion and precipitation in the Himalayas", which has been referenced over 500 times, according to Google Scholar.

Publications
Barros, AP; Hodes, JL; Arulraj, M, Decadal climate variability and the spatial organization of deep hydrological drought, Environmental Research Letters, vol 12 no. 10 (2017), pp. 104005–104005
Arulraj, M; Barros, AP, Shallow Precipitation Detection and Classification Using Multifrequency Radar Observations and Model Simulations, Journal of Atmospheric and Oceanic Technology, vol 34 no. 9 (2017), pp. 1963–1983
Understanding How Low-Level Clouds and Fog Modify the Diurnal Cycle of Orographic Precipitation Using In Situ and Satellite Observations, Remote Sensing, vol 9 no. 9 (2017), pp. 920–920
Wilson, AM; Barros, AP, Orographic Land–Atmosphere Interactions and the Diurnal Cycle of Low-Level Clouds and Fog, Journal of Hydrometeorology, vol 18 no. 5 (2017), pp. 1513–1533 
Tao, J; Barros, AP, Multi-year atmospheric forcing datasets for hydrologic modeling in regions of complex terrain – Methodology and evaluation over the Integrated Precipitation and Hydrology Experiment 2014 domain, Journal of Hydrology (2017)

References

Fellows of the American Association for the Advancement of Science
American civil engineers
Living people
Year of birth missing (living people)
University of Illinois Urbana-Champaign faculty
University of Washington College of Engineering alumni
University of Porto alumni
American women engineers
African-American engineers
Place of birth missing (living people)
Oregon Graduate Institute people
21st-century women engineers
Fellows of the American Meteorological Society
21st-century African-American people
21st-century African-American women